Dr. Neville H. Chittick (September 18, 1924 – July 27, 1984) was a British scholar and archaeologist. He specialized in the historic cultures of Northeast Africa, and also devoted various works to the Swahili Coast.

Biography
Chittick was born in 1924.

In a professional capacity, he initially worked with Max Mallowan as general field assistant in Nimrud in 1951 and later in Sudan as the Director of Antiquities. He later lived in Tanganyika, serving as the colonial territory's first Conservator of Antiquities.

In 1961, Chittick was appointed the first Director of the British Institute in Eastern Africa in Nairobi. He worked in that position until 1983.

After a long career in archaeology, Chittick died in 1984. He is buried in the Parish of the Ascension Burial Ground.

Expeditions
Chittick's expeditions and residence on the Swahili Coast produced a body of research into the pre-colonial sites Kilwa Kisiwani and the port of Manda Island.

He also wrote extensively on the archaeology of ancient civilizations in the more northerly Horn of Africa, such as the Axumite Empire and the Hafun city-states.

From late October to early December 1975, at the invitation of the Somali government, Chittick led a British-Somali archaeological expedition in the northern half of Somalia. Members of the party included the Director of the Somali National Museum in Mogadishu, Sa'id Ahmad Warsame, as well as 'Ali 'Abd al-Rahman and Fabby Nielson. Particular emphasis was placed on the area near Cape Guardafui in the far northeast. Financed by the Somali authorities, the reconnaissance mission found numerous examples of historical artefacts and structures, including ancient coins, Roman pottery, drystone buildings, cairns, mosques, walled enclosures, standing stones and platform monuments. Many of the finds were of pre-Islamic origin and associated with ancient settlements described by the 1st century Periplus of the Erythraean Sea, among other documents. Based on his discoveries, Chittick suggested in particular that the Damo site in the Hafun peninsula likely corresponded with the Periplus''' "Market and Cape of Spices". Some of the smaller artefacts that Chittick's company found were later deposited for preservation at the British National Museum.

Notes

References
The British Institute in Eastern Africa. (2008). BIEA Directors. Retrieved 2008-05-08.
Bethwell A. Ogot. (2003). My Footprints on the Sands of Time: An Autobiography. Trafford Publishing. .
British Embassy, Addis Ababa. (2008). History of the embassy: Britain in Ethiopia. Post-War Co-operation. Retrieved 2008-05-08.
Munro-Hay, Stuart C. (1989). Excavations at Aksum : An account of research at the ancient Ethiopian capital directed in 1972-4 by the late Dr. Neville Chittick''. British Institute in Eastern Africa. .

External links
 
  British Institute in Eastern Africa

British archaeologists
1924 births
1984 deaths
Somalists
Ethiopianists
British expatriates in Sudan
British expatriates in Tanzania
20th-century archaeologists